The women's high jump event at the 2011 All-Africa Games was held on 12 September.

Results

References
Results
Results

High
2011 in women's athletics